Dave Campfield is an American film director, producer, screenwriter and actor. He is the director of several feature films, including  Dark Chamber and Caesar and Otto's Summer Camp Massacre. His latest film Caesar and Otto's Paranormal Halloween featuring Deron Miller, Felissa Rose, Tiffany Shepis, Vernon Wells, Sean Whalen, Andre Gower, and Brinke Stevens is set to make its world premiere at the 2015 Florida Supercon in Miami, FL. Campfield has won over ten awards at indie film festivals including Best Actor for Caesar and Otto's Deadly Christmas at the Horrific Film Festival of San Antonio, TX and Best Screenplay at the Macabre Faire Film Festival of New York. Campfield also hosted  inravio.com's online program Nerdgasm from 2013–14. Since 2019, Campfield has been a regular contributor to Destinies-The Voice of Science Fiction's Film Review Team on WUSB (FM).  He is the director, writer and producer of Awaken the reaper which is co-produced by cinematographer Justin Paul. The project is currently filming with Fourth Horizon Cinema and Impact Media Productions at Design Weapons Studios in New York.

Filmography as a Director
 Caesar and Otto's Paranormal Halloween (2015)
 Caesar and Otto's Deadly XMas (2013)
 Caesar and Otto meet Dracula's Lawyer (2013)
 Caesar and Otto in the House of Dracula (2011)
 Caesar and Otto's Summer Camp Massacre (2011)
 Caesar and Otto (2009)
 Dark Chamber (2008)

Filmography as an Actor
 Caesar and Otto's Paranormal Halloween (2015)
 Escape from Kings Park (2014)
 The Perfect Candidate (2013)
 Caesar and Otto's Deadly XMas (2013)
 Caesar and Otto meet Dracula's Lawyer (2013)
 Caesar and Otto in the House of Dracula (2011)
 Caesar and Otto's Summer Camp Massacre (2011)
 Caesar and Otto (2009)
 Dark Chamber (2008)

References

External links
 
  Dave Campfield interview with 1428 Elm.com 
  Dave Campfield interview with The Horror Honeys
 Interview with Welivefilm

Living people
American film directors
Year of birth missing (living people)